Majuqiao Town is a town in Tongzhou District in the southeastern suburbs of Beijing, located barely inside the 6th Ring Road and near that highway's interchange with G2 Beijing–Shanghai Expressway. As of 2020, the town was home to 175,794 residents.

Around the end of Sui dynasty, this region was part of a horse farm. The settlement around the farm was known as Majuli, and a bridge named Majuqiao was built across Liangshui River. The town was named after the once-existed bridge.

History

Administrative divisions 
In 2021, Majuqiao Town comprised 55 subdivisions, of which 10 were communities and 45 were villages:

See also
List of township-level divisions of Beijing

References

Towns in Beijing
Tongzhou District, Beijing